Deliver Us is the fifth studio album by American melodic death metal band Darkest Hour. It was released on July 10, 2007 through Victory Records. The album debuted at number 110 on the Billboard album charts, with sales of 6,600. "Sanctuary" is featured in the video game Tony Hawk's Proving Ground, while "Demon(s)" is featured in Guitar Hero 5 and "Doomsayer" was made available in Guitar Hero: Warriors of Rock through the Darkest Hour Track Pack, the last to be released by Activision. The artwork was created by John Baizley who has also done art for bands such as Pig Destroyer and his own band Baroness. 
It is also the last album to feature lead guitarist Kris Norris.

Track listing

Personnel
 John Henry – vocals
 Kris Norris – lead guitar
 Mike Schleibaum – rhythm guitar
 Paul Burnette – bass
 Ryan Parrish – drums

Production
Devin Townsend – producer, mixing, engineer, guitar ("Full Imperial Collapse")
Dean Maher – engineer
UE Nastasi – mastering
Marian Greksa – mix assistant, additional vocals ("The Light at the Edge of the World")

Use in media
 The song "Demon(s)" can be heard in the episode "Escape from Dragon House" of HBO's True Blood. It is also a playable track in Guitar Hero 5.

References

Darkest Hour (band) albums
2007 albums
Victory Records albums
Albums with cover art by John Dyer Baizley
Albums produced by Devin Townsend